Peter Hay may refer to:

 Peter Háy (born 1944), Canadian writer
 Peter Grant Hay (1879–1961), Australian brewer and racehorse breeder
 Peter Thomas Hay (born 1932), authority on British steam railways
 Peter Alexander Hay (1866–1952), Scottish watercolourist
 Peter Seton Hay (1853–1907), New Zealand civil engineer and public servant
 Peter Hay (sailor), represented Australia in the Dragon World Championships
 Peter Hay (1951–2003), British artist and publisher, founder of Two Rivers Press

See also 
 Peter Hayes (disambiguation)